Acraea kalinzu is a butterfly in the family Nymphalidae. It is found in western Uganda, the Democratic Republic of the Congo (Kivu) and north-western Tanzania. The habitat consists of montane forests. See Pierre & Bernaud, 2014. for taxonomy.

References

External links

Images representing Acraea kalinzu at Bold
Acraea kalinzu at Pteron

Butterflies described in 1936
kalinzu